Sundsvalls SS is a Swedish swim team from Sundsvall training in Sporthallsbadet.

Olympics 
The team's most famous swimmers are Olympic gold medalist for 100m Butterfly Lars Frölander and Olympic bronze medalist Anna-Karin Kammerling.

Swimmers
Lars Frölander (1996-2001)
Anna-Karin Kammerling

External links
Sundsvalls SS's official homepage 

Swimming clubs in Sweden
Sport in Sundsvall